The Beasley River is a river in the Pilbara region of Western Australia.

The only tributary of the river is Beasley River West.

The river was named in 1962 after government surveyor Thomas Beasley, who first recorded it during an expedition in 1885. Previously the river had been known as the Turner River but was renamed to avoid confusion with the Turner River near Port Hedland.

References

Rivers of the Pilbara region